Kolah Jub-e Olya or Kaleh Jub-e Olya may refer to:
Kaleh Jub-e Olya, Eslamabad-e Gharb
Kolah Jub-e Olya 1
Kolah Jub-e Olya 2